Kassidy Sauvé (born May 19, 1996) is a Canadian ice hockey goaltender, currently signed with the Buffalo Beauts of the Premier Hockey Federation (PHF) for the 2022–23 season. She has previously played in the Finnish Naisten Liiga (NSML) with HPK Kiekkonaiset and was affiliated with the Professional Women's Hockey Players Association (PWHPA), representing the organization in showcases with the Calgary chapter, as Team Scotiabank, and the Toronto chapter, as Team Sonnet.

Playing career 
As a teenager, Sauvé played for the Whitby Wildcats in the boys' Eastern AAA Hockey League, making it to the 2012 OHL Cup.

From 2014 to 2018, she played with the Ohio State Buckeyes women's ice hockey program in the Western Collegiate Hockey Association (WCHA) conference of the NCAA Division I. She missed the latter half of the 2014–15 season and the entire 2015–16 season recovering from surgery after suffering a number of hip and leg injures, including a bone lesion on her femur. Across 88 games in three seasons with Ohio State, she posted 22 shutouts, a university record. 

After graduating from Ohio State University, she joined the Clarkson Golden Knights women's ice hockey program in the ECAC Hockey conference of the NCAA Division I for the 2018–19 season as a postgraduate player. Posting a .937 save percentage (SV%) with Clarkson and setting a university record for saves, she was named to the ECAC Third All-Star Team and was twice named ECAC Goaltender of the Month.

After graduating, she joined the PWHPA and spent the 2019–20 season with the organisation's New England hub. She made her PWHPA debut at the Dunkin' Showcase in Hudson, New Hampshire in October 2019, winning the showcase with Team Stecklein. She then played for Team Turnbull at the Philadelphia showcase in February 2020. She remained with the PWHPA for the 2020–21 season, being named to the roster for the Calgary hub, dubbed Team Scotiabank. In the 2021–22 season, she joined the Toronto hub, Team Sonnet.

In January 2022, Sauvé signed with the Naisten Liiga team HPK Naiset in Hämeenlinna, Finland, filling the vacancy created by the departure of Noora Räty to the Zhenskaya Hockey League. She recorded the best save percentage and goals against average (GAA) of all goaltenders in the lower division series, a .964 SV% and 0.88 GAA, buoying the team to the top of the division and securing a playoff berth. HPK lost the quarterfinals of the Aurora Borealis Cup playoffs in a four-game series against HIFK despite Sauvé's league-leading .955 SV% and highly competitive 2.29 GAA. Though she spent only a few months in Finland, Sauvé credited the time in the Naisten Liiga with reinvigorating her childhood love of ice hockey.

International career 
As a junior player with the Canadian national under-18 team, Sauvé participated in the 2014 IIHF World Women's U18 Championship. She played in two of Canada's five games, maintaining an exemplary 0.50 GAA and .978 save percentage as the country won gold.

Personal life 
Sauvé has a Master of Business Administration from Clarkson University and a bachelor's degree in sports industry from Ohio State University. 

Through her grandmother, she is related to former NHL goaltender Georges Vézina.

References

External links
 
 

1996 births
Living people
Buffalo Beauts players
Canadian expatriate ice hockey players in Finland
Canadian expatriate ice hockey players in the United States
Canadian women's ice hockey goaltenders
Clarkson University alumni
Clarkson Golden Knights women's ice hockey players
HPK Kiekkonaiset players
Ice hockey people from Ontario
Ohio State Buckeyes women's ice hockey players
Professional Women's Hockey Players Association players
Sportspeople from Whitby, Ontario